Vukašin Aleksić (born 10 January 1985) is a Serbian former professional basketball player.

Professional career
On 22 September 2012 Aleksić signed one-year contract with the Polish team Turów Zgorzelec after passing the 20-day tryout period.

National team
Aleksić won a gold medal at the 2001 Eurobasket With the Serbian national under-16 basketball team.

References

External links

 Vukašin Aleksić at euroleague.net
 Vukašin Aleksić at abaliga.com

1985 births
Living people
ABA League players
Basketball League of Serbia players
BC Nizhny Novgorod players
KK Hemofarm players
KK Igokea players
KK Mega Basket players
KK Metalac Valjevo players
KK Partizan players
KK Radnički Kragujevac (2009–2014) players
KK Lions/Swisslion Vršac players
KK Zdravlje players
Point guards
Serbian men's basketball players
Serbian expatriate basketball people in Russia
Serbian expatriate basketball people in Poland
Serbian expatriate basketball people in Bosnia and Herzegovina
Basketball players from Belgrade
Turów Zgorzelec players
Universiade medalists in basketball
Universiade gold medalists for Serbia
Universiade silver medalists for Serbia
Medalists at the 2009 Summer Universiade